Pegylated interferon (PEG-IFN) is a class of medication that includes three different drugs as of 2012:
 Pegylated interferon-alpha-2a
 Pegylated interferon-alpha-2b
 Pegylated interferon-beta-1a

In these formulations, Polyethylene glycol (PEG) is added to make interferon last longer in the body. They are used to treat both hepatitis B, hepatitis C and multiple sclerosis.

Pegylated interferon is contraindicated in patients with hyperbilirubinaemia.

References

Antiviral drugs
Immunostimulants
World Health Organization essential medicines